Leonid Bujor (27 November 1955 – 6 January 2021) was a Moldovan politician. He was the Minister of Education in the First Vlad Filat Cabinet from 25 September 2009 to 14 January 2011.

Biography 
Leonid Bujor was born on 27 November 1955, in Singureni, Rîşcani. He was a member of the Party Alliance Our Moldova. He was deputy in the Parliament of the Republic of Moldova in the Legislature 2005–2009, elected on the lists of the Democratic Moldova Democratic Bloc Party. He was succeeded in the Second Filat Cabinet by Mihail Șleahtițchi. Starting 18 February 2015 till 2 February 2016, he was Deputy Secretary General of the Cabinet of the Republic of Moldova. 

On 6 January 2021, amid the COVID-19 pandemic in Moldova, Bujor died from COVID-19 at the age of 65.

Distinctions and decorations
In December 2010 he was decorated with the "Order of Honor" by Interim President of the Republic of Moldova Mihai Ghimpu.

External links 
 Government of Moldova

References

 

1955 births
2021 deaths
People from Rîșcani District
Moldova State University alumni
20th-century Moldovan historians
Our Moldova Alliance politicians
Moldovan MPs 2005–2009
Moldovan MPs 2009
Moldovan MPs 2009–2010
Recipients of the Order of Honour (Moldova)
Deaths from the COVID-19 pandemic in Moldova